Voting to elect eight members of the Lebanese parliament took place in the Mount Lebanon I district (one of four electoral districts in the Mount Lebanon region) on 6 May 2018, part of the general election of that year. The constituency had 176,818 registered voters, out of whom 115,619 voted.

Demographics 
The electorate is predominantly Christian; Maronites make up 75.4% of the electorate, 10.4% Shia, 4.1% Greek Orthodox, 3.6% Greek Catholic, 1.9% Sunni and 4% other Christian communities.

Voting 
In Byblos-Kesrwan electoral district 5 lists were registered. The lists in the fray are the "Strong Lebanon" (supported by Free Patriotic Movement), the "National Solidarity" (Hezbollah), the "Anna al-Qarar" list (alliance between Kataeb Party, Fares Souhaid, Farid Heikal Khazen and independents, supported by Marada Movement, the "Clear Change" list (supported by Lebanese Forces) and the "Kulluna Watani" (We are all National) list.

In difference with previous elections, FPM and Hezbollah did not join forces on a common list. Hezbollah fielded its own list, with a Shia candidate (Hussein Zuaitar) from Baalbek. The Alliance National list included the former Telecommunications Minister Jean Louis Cardahi and dissident FPM politician Bassam Hachem, Hezbollah candidate and 4 other independents.

The FPM list was led by General Chamel Roukoz, with World Maronite Foundation president Neemat Frem, former minister Ziad Baroud and former parliamentarian Mansour al-Bon, amongst others.

The Kataeb-Souhaid supported list sought to include personalities from civil society. It included former National Bloc general secretary Jean Hawat. There was resistance from Kataeb side to field incumbent parliamentarians Youssef Khalil and Gilberte Zouein, since they were linked to the Change and Reform Bloc.

The "Kulluna Watani" (We are all National) list included former minister Youssef Salame.

Candidates

References